The inaugural regional elections in Tunisia were to be held in December 2018. The Fakhfakh Cabinet planned to hold the elections to the Regional Councils in 2022.

Background

References

See also 

2022 elections in Tunisia
2022 in Tunisia
Elections in Tunisia
Future elections in Africa
Local elections in Tunisia